Bjørn Maaseide (born 7 March 1968, in Stavanger) is a former beach volleyball player from Norway, who represented his native country in three consecutive Summer Olympics: 1996, 2000 and 2004. Alongside Jan Kvalheim he won several medals at the European Championships in the 1990s. He is the brother of professional female beach volleyball player Kathrine Maaseide. Other playing partners are Iver Horrem and Vegard Høidalen.

In 2007, however, Maaseide returned to the sand with Horrem. At the World Championships in Gstaad, they were knocked out in the first main round for the third time in a row, this time against the Brazilians Franco/Cunha. After the Norwegian duo missed out on the qualification they were aiming for at the Beijing Olympics, Maaseide turned his attention to the next World Championships. His commitment helped bring this event to his hometown of Stavanger, where a World Tour tournament had already been held for ten years.

References

External links
 
 
 
 

1968 births
Living people
Norwegian beach volleyball players
Men's beach volleyball players
Beach volleyball players at the 1996 Summer Olympics
Beach volleyball players at the 2000 Summer Olympics
Beach volleyball players at the 2004 Summer Olympics
Olympic beach volleyball players of Norway
Sportspeople from Stavanger
Competitors at the 1994 Goodwill Games
Goodwill Games medalists in beach volleyball